Meir Yitzhak Halevi (born 1953) is an Israeli politician who served as a member of the Knesset for the New Hope party and as deputy Minister of Education. He previously served as mayor of Eilat between 2003 and 2021.

Biography
Halevi was born in Jerusalem, in 1953, and is of Yemenite-Jewish descent, as his grandfather was the chief rabbi of Yemen.
Halevi fought in the Yom Kippur War.

Political career
He moved to Eilat in 1978 and ran the community centre and management college in the city. He was elected to the city council in 1993, and ran unsuccessfully for mayor in 1998. Between 1998 and 2003 he served as opposition leader on the council. He won the municipal election in 2003, and following the formation of Kadima, Halevi joined the new party. In the 2008 elections he was re-elected with 50% of the vote.

He gained notoriety for his "City Without Crime" program.
He left Likud and joined New Hope in 2020.

References

External links

List of Eilat's mayors  Eilat Municipality

1953 births
Living people
20th-century Israeli military personnel
Israeli Jews
Israeli officers
Israeli people of the Yom Kippur War
Israeli people of Yemeni-Jewish descent
Jewish Israeli politicians
Jewish military personnel
Kadima politicians
Mayors of places in Israel
Members of the 24th Knesset (2021–2022)
New Hope (Israel) politicians
People from Eilat
Politicians from Jerusalem
Israeli city councillors